The 1999 FIBA European Championship for Cadettes was the 13th edition of the European basketball championship for U16 women's teams, today known as FIBA U16 Women's European Championship. 12 teams featured in the competition, held in Tulcea, Romania, from 23 July to 1 August 1999.

Spain won their first title.

Qualification round
24 countries entered the qualification round. They were divided in five groups. The top three teams of each group qualified for the Challenge Round. 

Spain, Belarus and France received a bye to the Challenge Round. 

Romania (as host), Russia (as incumbent champion) and the Czech Republic (as incumbent runner-up) received a bye to the main tournament and did not play in the qualification round or the Challenge Round.

Group A
The games were played in Riga, Latvia, from August 21 to 23, 1998.

Group B
The games were played in Snina, Slovakia, from August 5 to 9, 1998.

Group C
The games were played in Škofja Loka, Slovenia, from August 5 to 9, 1998.

Group D
The games were played in Huskvarna, Sweden, from August 5 to 9, 1998.

Group E
The games were played in Adapazarı, Turkey, from August 5 to 9, 1998.

Challenge Round
Eighteen countries entered the Challenge Round: fifteen from the qualification round and Spain, Belarus and France. They were divide in three groups. The top three teams of each group qualified for the final round. 

Romania (as host), Russia (as incumbent champion) and the Czech Republic (as incumbent runner-up) received a bye to the main tournament.

Group A
The games were played in Umag, Croatia, from April 20 to 24, 1999.

Group B
The games were played in Völklingen, Germany, from April 7 to 11, 1999.

Group C
The games were played in Santander, Spain, from April 6 to 10, 1999.

Qualified teams
The following twelve teams qualified for the final tournament.

Main tournament
In the preliminary round, the twelve teams were allocated in two groups of six teams each. The top four teams of each group advanced to the quarterfinals. The last two teams of each group qualified for the 9th-12th playoffs.

Group round

Group A

Group B

Playoffs

9th-12th playoff

Championship playoff

5th-8th playoff

Final standings

External links
Official Site

1999
Bask
1999–2000 in European women's basketball
International youth basketball competitions hosted by Romania
International women's basketball competitions hosted by Romania